The Covenant is a 2006 American supernatural horror film written by J. S. Cardone, directed by Renny Harlin and starring Steven Strait, Sebastian Stan, Laura Ramsey, Taylor Kitsch, Jessica Lucas, Toby Hemingway and Chace Crawford. The film, despite being panned by critics, was a moderate box office success.

Plot

In the town of Ipswich, four high school boys – Caleb Danvers, Pogue Parry, Reid Garwin, and Tyler Simms, together known as the Sons of Ipswich – are the descendants of colonial witch families and thus wield magical abilities. Their powers manifest on their 13th birthday and grow stronger until they Ascend at 18. Ascending increases their powers significantly but also ties their powers to their life force. The more an Ascended individual uses their magic the more addicted to it they become, which can lead to premature aging and death.

While attending a bonfire, Caleb meets Sarah Wenham, a transfer student from a public high school in Boston. The Sons also meet Chase Collins, a new student at Spenser Academy. Their meeting is cut short when cops appear to break up the party. The boys escape by using their powers. After a student is found dead near their campus, various paranormal occurrences take place, with Sarah and her roommate Kate Tunney being the focus of it. Upset, Caleb suspects Reid – the most reckless of the warlocks – but he angrily denies the accusation.

Caleb and later Pogue see a "darkling", a dead spirit and a malicious omen. Meanwhile, Caleb and Sarah become romantically involved. During a swim race, Caleb notices Chase displaying magic usage. After researching, Caleb concludes that Chase descends from a fifth family, one believed long extinct. As the Sons discuss this revelation, Pogue learns that his girlfriend Kate was rendered comatose by a spell. Enraged, he hastily challenges Chase, who swiftly hospitalizes him.

Caleb visits Sarah, only to fall into Chase's trap. Chase reveals that he was unaware of his magic's origin, having been adopted. After locating his biological father, he learned of the price for Ascension; but it was too late and he has become addicted to using magic. His biological father then transferred his power to him. Chase wants to force other Ascended witches to transfer their power to him as well, starting with Caleb. Despite Caleb's warning that having more power does not save him from aging to death, Chase ignores him. Before leaving, Chase threatens Caleb's family and friends if he does not get what he wants. Caleb reveals the truth to Sarah and takes her to his father, a 44 year old man with a decrepit old body from magic abuse. When Sarah suggests that one of the other three transfer their power to Caleb so he could fight Chase he refuses as it would cost the person offering their life.

On the night of Caleb's 18th birthday, he leaves to face Chase and has Reid and Tyler safeguard Sarah. However, Chase easily kidnaps her. At an old barn, the two confront each other. Chase reveals a spellbound Sarah and gives Caleb an ultimatum of his life for hers. Caleb Ascends but refuses to give his power. The two duel but Chase is outmatched. Back at home, Evelyn, Caleb's mother, begs her husband to save Caleb. He transfers his power to his son and dies. Once his father's power is infused within him, Caleb hits Chase with a final blow that engulfs him. Sarah, Kate and Pogue are freed from their curses.

Firefighters arrive on the scene and inform them that a third person was not found, suggesting that Chase somehow survived and escaped. The pair get into Caleb's car and he casually uses magic to fix the busted windshield, unsettling Sarah as they drive off.

Cast
 Steven Strait as Caleb Danvers – the main protagonist; one of the four Sons of Ipswich, he attends Spenser Academy along with the other Sons and is the oldest and most responsible and protective of the four. He is very cautious about using the Power, due to the effect it has had on his father, and is the first to Ascend. 
 Sebastian Stan as Chase Collins – A new student at Spenser who befriends the Sons of Ipswich, and is the film's main antagonist.
 Laura Ramsey as Sarah Wenham – A new student at Spenser who transfers from a Boston public school and Caleb's love interest and Kate’s friend.
 Taylor Kitsch as Pogue Parry – One of the four Sons of Ipswich; the oldest after Caleb and his best friend, he's also Kate's boyfriend.
 Jessica Lucas as Kate Tunney – Sarah's roommate and Pogue's girlfriend.
 Toby Hemingway as Reid Garwin – One of the four Sons of Ipswich and the most reckless and sassiest of the four, who often butts heads with Caleb.
 Chace Crawford as Tyler Simms – One of the four Sons of Ipswich; the youngest of the four, who is the closest to Reid and usually takes his side.
 Kyle Schmid as Aaron Abbot – A pompous student and jock.
 Sarah Smyth as Kira Snider – A snobby student and Aaron's girlfriend.
 Wendy Crewson as Evelyn Danvers – Caleb's alcoholic mother, who worries about her son Ascending and becoming like his father.
 Stephen McHattie as William Danvers III – Caleb's father.
 Kenneth Welsh as Provost Higgins – Head of Spenser Academy.
 Jon McLaren as Bordy Becklin
 Steven Crowder as Party Kid

Graphic novel
A comic book prequel to the movie was released by Top Cow Comics. Top Cow Comics founder Marc Silvestri also served as associate producer for the film.

Reception

Critical response
On the review aggregator website Rotten Tomatoes, the film holds an approval rating of 4% based on 72 reviews, and an average score of 2.84/10. The website's critical consensus reads, "The Covenant plays out like a teen soap opera, full of pretty faces, wooden acting, laughable dialogue, and little suspense." The film is also on the site's "Worst of the Worst" list, ranking 31st. On Metacritic, the film has a weighted average score of 19 out of 100 based on reviews from 16 critics, indicating "overwhelming dislike". Audiences polled by CinemaScore gave the film an average grade of "B−" on an A+ to F scale.

Box office
Upon its release in the United States, the film managed to top the box office charts with a $8.9 million opening on what was called a "weak" weekend. By the end of its theatrical run, The Covenant earned $23.3 million in the U.S. and $13.9 million in other territories for a total of $37.3 million worldwide). The film cost roughly $20 million to produce, not including marketing.

Home media
The Covenant was released on DVD and Blu-ray on January 2, 2007. It went on to sell 1,618,891 units, which translated to revenue of $26,578,576.

References

External links

 
 
 
 
 

2006 films
2006 fantasy films
2006 horror films
2006 thriller films
2000s horror thriller films
2000s supernatural horror films
2000s supernatural thriller films
2000s teen fantasy films
2000s teen horror films
American fantasy thriller films
American horror thriller films
American supernatural horror films
American supernatural thriller films
American teen horror films
2000s English-language films
Films about witchcraft
Films directed by Renny Harlin
Films produced by Gary Lucchesi
Films produced by Tom Rosenberg
Films scored by Tomandandy
Films set in Massachusetts
Films shot in Nova Scotia
Films shot in Quebec
Lakeshore Entertainment films
Screen Gems films
2000s American films